Primorsky is a rural locality (a settlement) in Pugachyovskoye Rural Settlement, Kotelnikovsky District, Volgograd Oblast, Russia. The population was 134 as of 2010. There are 5 streets.

Geography 
Primorsky is located in steppe, on the east bank of the Tsimlyansk Reservoir, 51 km north of Kotelnikovo (the district's administrative centre) by road. Pugachyovskaya is the nearest rural locality.

References 

Rural localities in Kotelnikovsky District